Nepali Rastriya Janabhavana Party is a political party in Nepal. The party is registered with the Election Commission of Nepal ahead of the 2008 Constituent Assembly election.

The party forms part of the Samyukta Samabeshi Morcha.

References

Political parties in Nepal